Alexander Hall (January 11, 1894 – July 30, 1968) was an American film director, film editor and theatre actor.

Biography
Hall acted in the theatre from the age of four through 1914, when he began to work in silent movies. Following his military service in World War I, he returned to Hollywood and pursued a career in film production. He worked as a film editor and assistant director at Paramount Pictures until 1932, when he directed his first feature film, Sinners in the Sun. From 1937 to 1947, he was a contract director at Columbia Pictures, where he earned a reputation for sophisticated comedies. He was nominated for the Academy Award for Best Director for Here Comes Mr. Jordan (1941).

From 1934 to 1936, Hall was married to actress Lola Lane. He was also married to Marjorie Hunter.

In 1952 Hall had a home in Palm Springs, California. He was engaged briefly to Lucille Ball, who left him when she met Desi Arnaz. The couple later hired him to direct their 1956 film Forever, Darling.

Hall died of complications from a stroke in San Francisco. He was survived by a son.

Partial filmography

 The Leech (1921)
 A Game of Craft (1922)
 The Heart of a Siren (1925)
 Miss Nobody (1926)
 The Crash (1928, editor)
 Kismet (1930, editor)
 Sinners in the Sun (1932)
 Madame Racketeer (1932)
 The Girl in 419 (1933)
 Midnight Club (1933)
 Torch Singer (1933)
 Limehouse Blues (1934)
 Little Miss Marker (1934)
 Miss Fane's Baby Is Stolen (1934)
 The Pursuit of Happiness (1934)
 Goin' to Town (1935)
 There's Always a Woman (1938)
 I Am the Law (1938)
 There's That Woman Again (1938)
 The Lady's from Kentucky (1939)
 Good Girls Go to Paris (1939)
 The Amazing Mr. Williams (1939)
 He Stayed for Breakfast (1940)
 This Thing Called Love (1940)
 Bedtime Story (1941)
 Here Comes Mr. Jordan (1941)
 My Sister Eileen (1942)
 They All Kissed the Bride (1942)
 She Wouldn't Say Yes (1945)
 Down to Earth (1947 film) (1947)
 The Great Lover (1949)
 Louisa (1950)
 Because You're Mine (1952)
 Let's Do It Again (1953)
 Forever, Darling (1956)

References

External links

 
 

1894 births
1968 deaths
American film directors
American male stage actors
Male actors from Boston